INCA (Integrated Calibration and Application Tool) is a measurement, calibration and diagnostic software published by ETAS. With its large installation base in the auto industry, this development software

 is deployed during all phases of the development of electronic control units (ECUs) and ECU software programs for measuring, calibration, diagnostics and programming.

Description 
Calibrating an ECU software with the aid of INCA enables engineers to adapt the behavior of control and diagnostic functions to a variety of vehicle models and/or model variants, without requiring the modification of calculation routines. As part of this process, characteristic values of function algorithms are entered while simultaneously acquiring signals from ECUs, vehicle data buses and measuring instruments. During the calibration process in INCA, the ECU signals are visualized, which means that any change occurring inside the ECU can be followed up by a detailed examination and analysis of system behavior. This type of characteristics calibration may take place on board the vehicle, in the lab, on test benches or in combination with simulation environments, such as Simulink.

Feature set 
A host of functions required for ECU software calibration, such as interface-dependent calibration methods, calibration data management, measurement data visualization and analysis, ECU programming, vehicle bus monitoring, as well as remote control through standard interfaces, are part of the product's functional complement. Available add-ons facilitate the integration of additional functions, such as the symbolic representation of diagnostic data, the calibration of  Simulink® models, the integration of LIN and FlexRay buses, plus software calibration and validation by means of rapid prototyping hardware.
In combination with suitable hardware products, INCA can access standard ECU interfaces, such as CAN, K-Line, ETK, USB, Ethernet and FlexRay.

 ECU access via CAN, using the CCP, KWP2000, UDS and XCP protocols.
 ECU access via FlexRay and XCP protocol
 ECU access via Ethernet and XCP protocol
 ECU access via USB and XCP protocol
 ECU access via K-Line, using KWP2000 and Mc-Mess protocols
 ECU access with parallel ETKs via address bus and data bus
 ECU access with serial ETKs, through microcontroller debugging interfaces such as NEXUS, JTAG and AUD
 ECU access via J2534
 Simultaneous access to several ECUs

Supported standards 
 Supports ASAM MCD standards MCD-1b, MCD-2 MC, MCD-2 D(ODX), MDF, MCD-2 Net (Fibex), ASAP3 and MCD-3 MC, AE CDF
 Supports the CANdb for CAN monitoring and transmission of CAN messages
 Recording of measurement data in the file formats MDF3, ASCII, MDF4, DI-ADEM-ATF, FAMOS and MATLAB®-M
 COM-API enable interaction with Windows® PC-based applications
 MATLAB®-API for access to MATLAB® as a control and analysis application
 Exchange of calibration data in physical representation, using the DCM, CVX and CDF2.0 formats
 Supports numerous HEX file formats, e.g., Motorola-S or Intel HEX

References

External links 
 INCA Product Family page on ETAS website
 Supported standards, ECU Interfaces and Technical Data

Computer-aided engineering software
Data analysis software